Incilius marmoreus, commonly known as Wiegmann's toad or marbled toad, is a species of toad in the family Bufonidae. It is endemic to Mexico and found along the Pacific coastal plain between northern Sinaloa and Chiapas. There is also an isolated population in the region of Veracruz on the Atlantic coast, and a record from Hidalgo.

Its natural habitats are tropical deciduous and semi-deciduous forests; it also occurs in disturbed habitats that remain relatively closed. Breeding takes place in streams. It is a very common species that might locally be affected by extreme habitat alteration.

References

marmoreus
Endemic amphibians of Mexico
Amphibians described in 1833
Taxa named by Arend Friedrich August Wiegmann
Taxonomy articles created by Polbot
Sinaloan dry forests
Jalisco dry forests
Fauna of the Southern Pacific dry forests
Sonoran–Sinaloan transition subtropical dry forest